Javier Eraso Goñi (born 22 March 1990) is a Spanish professional footballer who plays for Cypriot club Akritas Chlorakas as a midfielder.

Club career
Born in Pamplona, Navarre, Eraso graduated from Athletic Bilbao's youth setup, and started playing as a senior in the 2008–09 season with CD Basconia, in the Tercera División. One year later, he was promoted to the reserves in the Segunda División B.

On 19 June 2013, Eraso was released by the Lions and joined CD Leganés also of the third division the following month. He appeared in 42 games during the campaign, as the Madrid club was promoted to Segunda División after a ten-year absence.

Eraso played his first match as a professional on 7 September 2014, starting in a 3–1 home win against RCD Mallorca. He scored his first goal in the second tier on 21 December, the last in 2–0 home victory over Recreativo de Huelva.

On 31 May 2015, Eraso scored a hat-trick in a 5–2 away rout of FC Barcelona B. On 1 July he returned to Athletic, now being assigned to the first team in La Liga.

Eraso made his official debut for Athletic on 30 July 2015, starting and scoring both goals in a 2–0 win against Inter Baku PIK at the San Mamés Stadium in the third qualifying round of the UEFA Europa League. He netted his first top-flight goal on 13 February of the following year, equalising an eventual 4–2 away loss to Real Madrid.

Eraso returned to Leganés on 24 July 2017, with the side now competing in the top division. He went on to make 215 competitive appearances over two spells at the Estadio Municipal de Butarque, being relegated in 2019–20.

On 4 July 2022, Eraso moved abroad for the first time in his career, with the 32-year-old signing a two-year contract with Cypriot First Division newcomers Akritas Chlorakas.

International career
Eraso did not earn any caps for Spain at any level. He did feature for the unofficial Basque Country regional team.

Honours
Athletic Bilbao
Supercopa de España: 2015

References

External links

1990 births
Living people
Spanish footballers
Footballers from Pamplona
Association football midfielders
La Liga players
Segunda División players
Segunda División B players
Tercera División players
CD Basconia footballers
Bilbao Athletic footballers
CD Leganés players
Athletic Bilbao footballers
Cypriot First Division players
Akritas Chlorakas players
Basque Country international footballers
Spanish expatriate footballers
Expatriate footballers in Cyprus
Spanish expatriate sportspeople in Cyprus